Apowollastonia is a genus of flowering plants belonging to the family Asteraceae.

Its native range is Lesser Sunda Islands to New Guinea and Australia.

Species:

Apowollastonia cylindrica 
Apowollastonia hamersleyensis 
Apowollastonia hibernica 
Apowollastonia longipes 
Apowollastonia major 
Apowollastonia spilanthoides 
Apowollastonia stirlingii 
Apowollastonia verbesinoides

References

Asteraceae
Asteraceae genera